The list of ship commissionings in 1919 includes a chronological list of ships commissioned in 1919.  In cases where no official commissioning ceremony was held, the date of service entry may be used instead.


References 

1919
 Ship commissionings
 Ship launches
Ship launches